Ramtek Assembly constituency is one of twelve constituencies of the Maharashtra Vidhan Sabha located in the Nagpur district.

It is a part of the Ramtek (Lok Sabha constituency)(SC) from Nagpur district along with five other assembly constituencies, viz Katol, Hingna, Umred(SC), Kamthi and Savner Assembly constituency.

Members of Vidhan Sabha

^ by-poll

Election Results

1962 Election
 Pathan Mohammad Abdullakhan (INC) : 11,840 votes
 Vishnu Mahadeo Dhoble (IND) : 8283

2014 Election
 Dwaram Mallikarjun Ram Reddy (BJP ) : winner 
 Ashish Jaiswal (Shiv Sena)

2019 Election
 Ashish Jaiswal (Independent) : winner, 67419 votes 
 Dwaram Mallikarjun Ram Reddy (BJP) : 43,006

See also
Mouda
Parseoni
Ramtek
Ramtek Lok Sabha constituency

References

Assembly constituencies of Maharashtra
Assembly constituencies of Nagpur district